The following elections occurred in the year 1957.

Africa
 1957 Gabonese legislative election
 1957 Chadian parliamentary election
 1957 Ethiopian general election
 1957 Guinean Territorial Assembly election
 1957 Upper Volta territorial assembly election
 1956–1957 Kenyan legislative election
 1957 Senegalese Territorial Assembly election
 1957 Sierra Leonean legislative election
 1957 Ubangi-Shari parliamentary election
 1957 Zanzibari general election

Asia
 1957 Israeli presidential election
 1957 North Korean parliamentary election
 1957 Philippine House of Representatives elections
 1957 Singapore City Council election
 February 1957 Thai general election
 December 1957 Thai general election
 1957 Philippine general election:
 1957 Philippine presidential election
 1957 Philippine House of Representatives elections
 1957 Philippine Senate election

India
 1957 Indian general election
 1951–1971 Indian general elections
 Indian general election in Madras, 1957
 1957 Indian presidential election
 1957 Madras State legislative assembly election
 1957 West Bengal state assembly election

Europe
 1957 Danish parliamentary election
 1957 Irish general election
 1957 Portuguese legislative election
 1957 Turkish general election
 1957 West German federal election
 1957 Norwegian parliamentary election
 1957 Polish legislative election

United Kingdom
 1957 Bristol West by-election
 1957 Carmarthen by-election
 1957 Ipswich by-election

North America
 1957 British Honduras legislative election

Canada
 1957 Alberta liquor plebiscite
 1957 Edmonton municipal election
 1957 Canadian federal election
 1957 Northwest Territories general election

Caribbean
 1957 Haitian presidential election

South America 
 1957 Argentine Constitutional Assembly election
 1957 Guatemalan general election
 1957 Honduran Constituent Assembly election
 1957 Honduran presidential election
 1957 Nicaraguan general election

Oceania
 1957 New Zealand general election

Australia
 1957 Queensland state election

See also

 
1957
Elections